The following lists events that happened in 1927 in El Salvador.

Incumbents
President: Alfonso Quiñónez Molina (until 1 March), Pío Romero Bosque (starting 1 March)
Vice President: Pío Romero Bosque (until 1 March), Gustavo Vides (starting 1 March)

Events

January
 9 January – Voters in El Salvador elected National Democratic Party candidate Pío Romero Bosque as President of El Salvador with 192,860 votes and a 100% margin. He was the only candidate.

March
 1 March – Pío Romero Bosque was sworn in as President of El Salvador. Gustavo Vides was sworn in as Vice President.
 27 March – C.D. Vendaval Apopa, a Salvadoran football club, was established.

Births
 6 August – Arturo Armando Molina, politician

References

 
El Salvador
1920s in El Salvador
Years of the 20th century in El Salvador
El Salvador